Eoghan Campbell (born 1994) is a hurler from Northern Ireland who plays for Antrim Senior Championship club Ruairí Óg and at inter-county level with the Antrim senior hurling team. He usually lines out as a wing-back.

Career

Campbell joined the Ruairí Óg club in Cushendall at a young age and played in all grades at juvenile and underage levels. As a member of the club's senior team he lined out at centre-back when Ruairí Óg lost the 2016 All-Ireland club final to Na Piarsaigh. At inter-county level, Campbell won three consecutive Ulster Championships with the Antrim under-21 team and was at midfield for the 2013 All-Ireland U21 final defeat by Wexford. As a member of the Antrim senior hurling team he has won five consecutive Ulster Championship titles, a National League Division 2A title and a Joe McDonagh Cup title.

Honours

Ruairí Óg
Ulster Senior Club Hurling Championship: 2015, 2018
Antrim Senior Hurling Championship: 2014, 2015, 2018

Antrim
Ulster Senior Hurling Championship: 2013, 2014, 2015, 2016, 2017
Joe McDonagh Cup: 2020
National Hurling League Division 2A: 2017
Ulster Under-21 Hurling Championship: 2013, 2014, 2015

References

External links
Eoghan Campbell profile at the Antrim GAA website

1994 births
Living people
Ruairi Og Cushendall hurlers
Antrim inter-county hurlers